Lamas (also spelled Lammas) is a village in Broadland, Norfolk, England. Administratively it falls within the civil parish of Buxton with Lamas.

The village's name means "loam marsh".

Location
Located between Norwich and Aylsham, Lamas is a linear village immediately to the east of the larger village of Buxton, and where the two meet is Buxton Mill. Lamas is separated by the River Bure from Buxton.

Description
Lamas gives the impression of being a sleepy, rural place. Today it has no pubs or shops, being served by Buxton. The village's two main roads are called The Street and Scottow Road (which is the continuation of The Street leading to RAF Coltishall). There are four large houses located within the village, Lammas Hall, which is located in a park, and not visible from the road, the Tudor Manor House, which Pevsner describes as having formed part of a larger structure (today this is two houses), Bure House, which stands on the other side of the churchyard from the Manor, and the Rectory, which is located on the Little Hautbois Road. A house opposite Bure House describes itself as 'Blacksmith's Cottage', a reference to its former use as a Blacksmith. Early photographs of the village show that the house called 'The Old Anchor of Hope' by the river Bure was once a pub.

In earlier centuries, agriculture was the main industry. Today, Lamas serves mainly as a dormitory for the city of Norwich, with many residents using the village as a retreat from jobs in Norwich City centre and the surrounding area, with daily commutes into the City.

Local government
For local government purposes, the two villages jointly elect the Buxton with Lamas Parish Council, and both fall within the area covered by Broadland District Council and Norfolk County Council. Lamas and Buxton together have a population of 1,695. Although Lamas is the smaller of the two places, it is historically a parish in its own right, and for centuries had its own Rector. Lamas has been united with the neighbouring hamlet of Little Hautbois since the 15th century. The village is a part of the Buxton Division of the district of Broadland, and the Aylsham Division of the County Council.

Places of worship
The village church is dedicated to St. Andrew. Much restored in the 19th century, the church nevertheless still displays some traces of Anglo-Saxon work in the walls of the nave. The chancel slants away from the nave, probably due to the marshy nature of the riverside site. Inside, there is a finely-painted organ decorated with images of St. George and St. Michael. Two RAF standards hang in the chancel. A late 19th-century writer reports that, prior to the restoration, the old church possessed some fine medieval figurative stained-glass, but that this had vanished during the restoration. Today, the church possesses a ring of five bells, and the ringing chamber was extensively restored by Peggy Anne Williamson of Lammas Hall, a former tower captain. The writer Anna Sewell is buried in the graveyard of the old Quaker Meeting-House on The Street. The meeting house itself has now been converted into a residential house, but Anna Sewell's gravestone is set in a wall fronting the Street. The other stones commemorate local benefactors John Wright and Phillip Sewell, of Dudwick Park, Buxton. The burial ground was partially destroyed in 1984, when a large part was bulldozed without permission. A map of the village dated 1885 indicates that the Friends at one point let the Meeting House to the Wesleyan Methodists, while retaining the burial ground. 

In the 19th century, Lamas had a small Particular Baptist Chapel, but this has long since vanished. Calvinistic Baptist John Grace, minister of Tabernacle Chapel, Brighton preached here in 1856.

The Rector of Lamas from 1738 to 1754, the Reverend William Lubbock, was the ancestor of the Lubbock family, Lords Avebury.

One of the former Rectors of the Parish is named simply as 'Roger' on the board in the Church. Local legend says this is because he murdered a man shortly after he had been inducted to the benefice and fled. It is said that the man's body still lies under the church porch.

The Rev. Dr Peter Hansell, married to the Revd Anupama Kamble-Hansell, was instituted as Rector of the Bure Valley Benefice in September 2010 (his wife as Assistant Curate of Bure Valley /St Edmundsbury & Ipswich/ until her resignation in 2013), until his 30 August 2013 appointment to be Chaplain of Trent College, Long Eaton (Derby).

Historic houses
Lammas Hall, a large building of uncertain date, lies in a small park, concealed from the road. The building has a 17th-century porch, a doorcase with stone quoins contained within a 19th-century single storey brick porch. The North wing is of the same date as the porch. The shaped gable above the entrance is one of the few surviving traces of architecture. Limewash has been applied to the exterior in an attempt to create an impression of architectural unity. Among the notable inhabitants of the Hall was Wallace White Williamson, actuary, of Norwich Union, who is buried at the church. The Hall was an old people's home for a time, before returning to private ownership.

The Manor House was built in several sections over the centuries. It was begun by three sheep farming brothers, the Allens, around the reign of Henry VII, with subsequent extensions: the east gable was said by Pevsner to bear the date of 1525 on the east gable. It was extended to the west around 1600. There appears to be a Georgian addition to the west gable, and there was one final modern alteration/extension carried out in the late 1980s. The Manor became the home of the Dammant family between the 17th century and the early 19th century. They were a family of doctors who had a private gate to the adjacent church through the brick wall which partly bounds the property. After their departure, the house was subdivided into five homes, chiefly for workers at Lammas Hall. It was bought and restored by Canon and Mary Boston in the 1960s.

The slightly eccentric looking house with Dutch gables on the Little Hautbois Road was once the home of Walter Rye, the historian, pioneer of cross-country running and one-time mayor of Norwich. Although Rye died in Norwich, he is buried at the entrance to the churchyard extension. Rye bought what was at that time called Rectory Cottage, and extended it, incorporating a former schoolroom as a large parlour. The stained glass roundels containing the arms of every former Lord of the Manor of Lamas, now in the church, were originally created for this house.

Lamas in 1845
William White's History, Gazetteer, and Directory of Norfolk, 1845 says of Lamas:

Sources
 Pevsner, Nikolaus, The Buildings of England: North-East Norfolk and Norwich
 Anon. (but reputedly Wallace White Williamson), Guide to Lamas Church
 Donald Mackenzie, Lamas Church Guidebook.
 Key to English Place-names

References

External links

Broadland
Villages in Norfolk